The Ministry of Education of the Union of Soviet Socialist Republics (USSR), formed on 3 August 1966, was one of the most important government offices in the Soviet Union. It was known as the People's Commissariat for Education, or Narkompros, until 1946. Narkompros was a Soviet agency founded by the State Commission on Education and charged with the administration of public education and most of other issues related to culture.

Its first head was Anatoly Lunacharsky. However he described Nadezhda Krupskaya as the "soul of Narkompros". Mikhail Pokrovsky and Evgraf Litkens also played important roles.

Lunacharsky protected most of the avant-garde artists such as Vladimir Mayakovsky, Kazimir Malevich, Vladimir Tatlin and Vsevolod Meyerhold. Despite his efforts, the official policy after Joseph Stalin put him in disgrace.

Narkompros had a number of sections, in addition to the main ones related to general education, e.g.,
 Likbez, a section for liquidation of illiteracy,
 "Profobr", a section for professional education,
 Glavlit a section for literature and publishing (also in charge of censorship in publishing),
 "Glavrepertkom" (Главрепертком), a commission for approval of performers' repertoires.
 Department of the Mobilisation of Scientific Forces, to which the Russian Academy of Sciences reported to after 1918.
 A Theatre Department which published Vestnik Teatra
 Vneshkol'nyi Otdel, the adult Education Department run by Krupskaya
Some of these evolved into separate entities, others discontinued.

History
The first Commissar was Anatoly Lunacharsky appointed in 1917.

The Ministry of Education, at the all-Union level, was established on 3 August 1966.

Commissars and ministers

The following persons headed the Commissariat/Ministry as commissars (narkoms) and ministers:

Note 
The Ministry of Religious Affairs and Public Education of the Russian Empire, which was formed by combining:
 Ministry of National Education (Russian Empire);
 The Chief Directorate of Religious Affairs of the Orthodox Faith of the Most Holy Synod;
 The Chief Directorate of Religious Affairs of Foreign (i.e. non-Orthodox) Faiths,
and directed the spiritual affairs of all faiths in Russia and the institutions of public education and science, trying to restore rights in East Slavic culture of Russian Federation.

See also 
 Education in the Soviet Union
 Ministries of the Soviet Union
 People's Commissariat for Education
 Ministry of Education and Science (Russia)
 Ministry of National Education (Russian Empire)

References

Bibliography
 Bird, Alan. A History of Russian Painting. G.K. Hall Painting, Russian, 2007.
 Graham, Loren R. Science in Russia and the Soviet Union. Science—Soviet Union, 1993.
 Constantin, Nathan. A Study of Bolshevism. Free Press, 1953.
 Smele, Jon. The Russian Revolution and Civil War. Continuum International, 2003.
 Fitzpatrick, Sheila. The Commissariat of Enlightenment. Cambridge University, 1970.

External links 
 Education in Russia for foreign citizens. The history of the formation of education.Образование в России для иностранных граждан. История становления образования.
 Education in Russia for the foreign citizens: Russian Educational System Today
 The Governments of the Union of Soviet Socialist Republics 1917–1964

Education
Education in the Soviet Union
1991 disestablishments in the Soviet Union
Soviet
1923 establishments in the Soviet Union